The Business Journalist of the Year Awards were recognized as important global awards for business writers and broadcasters. They were open to journalists of all nationalities, and covered the entire spectrum of business and financial reporting.

The Business Journalist of the Year Awards (first presented in 1999) were created by The Leadership Forum, previously the World Leadership Forum, Ltd., (both of which have ceased operation) because business information had become a global commodity paying little heed to national borders. In a world where goods, services, money and knowledge move ever more freely from one domain to another, the source of business information is no longer relevant - only its quality matters. That's the spirit these awards were created in, and the spirit in which they have grown.

The Business Journalist of the Year Awards had been judged exclusively by journalists and governed by the World's leading business editors. In 2007, the Editors' Committee was composed of Martin Dickson, Deputy Editor of the Financial Times; Robert Peston, business editor at the BBC; Hugo Dixon, editor-in-chief and chairman of Breakingviews; Jesse Lewis, managing editor of The Wall Street Journal Europe; and Rik Kirkland, former managing editor of Fortune.

References

External links
 Business Journalist of the Year Awards
 The Independent, Media Awards: We are going for a gong

British journalism awards
Business and industry awards
1999 establishments in the United Kingdom
Awards established in 1999
Business mass media in the United Kingdom
Business journalism